Northeast District Park is a 66 acre public park in Chatham County, North Carolina in the United States, operated by the Chatham County Parks and Recreation Department.

Amenities include a regulation-size baseball field with lights and bleachers, two regulation tennis courts, a multipurpose field for soccer, ultimate, football, rugby, and other field sports approximately 125 by 85 yards with bleachers (approx. 150 seats), a restroom/concession building, a picnic shelter with pond view, a playground, a 1/4-mile asphalt walking trail that loops the pond, and parking.

The pond existed as part of the farm that was on the parklands before the park was developed.

Use of firearms is forbidden in the gamelands around the park. Signs are posted to indicate that only bow hunting is allowed in this area.

References

External links
Google Map Northeast District Park, 5408 Big Woods Road on Google Maps
History of Northeast District Park

Parks in North Carolina
Protected areas of Chatham County, North Carolina